Pyrgophorus is a genus of very small freshwater snails with a gill and an operculum, aquatic gastropod molluscs in the family Hydrobiidae.

Species 
Species in the genus Pyrgophorus include:
Pyrgophorus cisterninus (Küster, 1852)
Pyrgophorus parvulus (Guilding, 1828)
Pyrgophorus platyrachis (Thompson, 1968) - serrate crownsnail
Pyrgophorus spinosus (Call & Pilsbry, 1886) - spiny crownsnail
Pyrgophorus coronatus (Pfeiffer, 1840)

References

Hydrobiidae
Taxa named by César Marie Félix Ancey